The picazuro pigeon (Patagioenas picazuro) is a pigeon native to South America.

Description
It is a large pigeon with a wingspan of up to 22 inches and can weigh as much as a pound.  It is a brown bird with white dashes on the back of its neck and darker brown wing patterns. It is similar in appearance to the spotted dove.

Distribution
The picazuro pigeon is found in Argentina, Bolivia, Brazil, Paraguay and Uruguay. It has an estimated global extent of occurrence of 5,800,000 km2 and although an accurate population count has not taken place, it is believed that the species is common and the population is thought to be increasing. Picazuro pigeons survive in a variety of habitats; from woodland and forest to agricultural land.

Diet
This species feeds mainly on the ground and like most other pigeons eats seeds and grain.

Reproduction
Picazuro pigeons nest in every month of the year. A fragile nest is built from sticks and one egg is laid. Both parents incubate the egg. Once the egg has hatched, the chick is fed on crop milk and then regurgitated seeds.

References

 InfoNatura: Birds, mammals, and amphibians of Latin America [web application]. 2004. Version 4.1 . Arlington, Virginia (USA): NatureServe. Available: . (Accessed: April 7, 2007 ).

External links
Picazuro pigeon in Ceará, Brazil: Photo, vocalization from www.birds-caatinga.com
 

picazuro pigeon
Birds of Argentina
Birds of Brazil
Birds of Paraguay
Birds of Uruguay
picazuro pigeon